This is a list of Lieutenants and Keepers of Hampton Court Chase and ex officio (by virtue of that office) Rangers of Bushy Park.

History

In 1539 Hampton Court Chase was created an 'Honour' by an Act of Parliament instigated by Henry VIII and passed as a public act by approval of Parliament and the King. The title holder increasingly over time referred to as Ranger or Keeper of Bushey Park held as his domain the right to build and rebuild a grand house in Bushy Park coupled with a degree of local power and exercise likewise to the monarch in hunting rights. Henry thereby created the first forest since the New Forest of William the Conqueror and obtained the rights to a share of cattle and game in the extent to append to his "close park" to Hampton Court Palace taken from Wolsey. The area's other local landowners included principally manorial tenants of the confiscated Chertsey and Westminster Abbeys – and made all non-mete parts an overall chase for royal and official hunting parties for boar, game birds, hare, coneys and deer.  Holding all persons to account for animal grazing and wood-taking financially were added benefits. The statute set up a new forest or chase for the king, to be called 'Hampton Court Chase' but which was smaller than the many square miles the King wished:

The bounds of the chase apart from Bushy Park took in the manors of Hampton, Hanworth, Kempton, Walton-on-Thames. Parliament, through the courts, was deemed to have strongly curtailed its royal forest rights so as not to impinge on freeholds nor main customary tenants lands in Molesey, Weybridge, Cobham and part of Esher, its furthest reach due to Henry's legal deed (indenture) of 1537.

The Ranger or Keeper in early years held the position of Housekeeper of the Palace. The rangership of the land in the bend of the river east of the Palace, the 'House' or 'Home' Park was usually separate. Kit Villiers, an ennobled courtier by James I, inherited the honour from his brother and took as his official seat Ashley House (and Ashley Park) in Walton on Thames.  Reinstatement in wealth and titles to the Villiers (Earls of Jersey and Anglesey) family after the English Civil War failed to reunite the more southerly lands associated with the honour which were taken and sold in the course of the 1649-1660 Commonwealth of England. Some holders of the title lived in Bushy Park seasonally or as their main home. The monarch tended to grant the title to the main heir of the previous holder.  Parliament in the English Interregnum granted the title to General Monck, who remained in favour in the English Restoration.

Office Holders

See also
Bushy Park
Bushy House/The New Lodge (National Physical Laboratory)
Ashley Park House (demolished)
Acts of 1539 (Henry VIII anno 31, chapter 5) of the Parliament of England
Royal chase
Royal forest

Notes and references
References

Notes

Bushy Park
Hunting and shooting in England
Forests and woodlands of London
United Kingdom nature-related lists